Second-seeded Marty Riessen and Margaret Court won the title by defeating fifth-seeded Dennis Ralston and Françoise Dürr 7–5, 6–3 in the final.

Seeds

Draw

Finals

Top half

Section 1

Section 2

Bottom half

Section 3

Section 4

References

External link
1969 US Open – Doubles draws and results at the International Tennis Federation

Mixed Doubles
US Open (tennis) by year – Mixed doubles